Gunnar Johnson (July 3, 1889 – June 19, 1926) was a Swedish track and field athlete who competed in the 1912 Summer Olympics. In 1912 he finished eleventh in the hammer throw competition.

References

External links
Profile 

1889 births
1926 deaths
Swedish male hammer throwers
Olympic athletes of Sweden
Athletes (track and field) at the 1912 Summer Olympics